The system of transportation in the Gambia mixes both public and private operations and consists of a system of roads (both paved and unpaved), water and air transportation. The Trans-Gambia Highway runs along both sides of the river Gambia, which bisects the country. The river may be crossed by ferry or the Senegambia bridge. There are no railways in the country.

History 
During the colonial era, several small railways existed in the Gambia. One, in Bathurst (now Banjul), stretched from Wellington Street to The Marina, now Liberation Avenue and Marina Parade respectively. A War Office map from 1909 clearly shows the railway. Both Kuntaur and Kaur had similar railways from the wharfs to the warehouses. The railways had hand-pushed wagons for transporting of goods from ships. They were used by large companies involved in trading, such as Maurel & Prom. These railways existed until the 1960s.

Railways
In 2009 an agreement was signed between Japan and Gambia for construction of a railway to Senegal.

Roads
Highways:The most important highway in the Gambia is the Trans-Gambia Highway.

total: 3,742 km (country comparison to the world: 159)
paved: 723 km
unpaved: 3,019 km (2004)
Newly paved roads are usually in excellent condition.

Waterways

Waterways: 390 km (small ocean-going vessels can reach 190 km) (2008)
country comparison to the world: 90

Ports and harbours: Banjul, Gambia Ports Authority

Merchant marine:
total:5
country comparison to the world: 133
by type: passenger/cargo: 4, petroleum tanker 1 (2008)

Airports
 
The country's only international airport is at Yundum, 26 km from Banjul. Airports: 1 (2008): Banjul International Airport Yundum.
country comparison to the world: 133Airports - with paved runways:'''total: 1 over 3,047 m:'' 1 (2008)

References